Laredo is a surname. Notable people with the surname include:

 Federico Laredo Brú (1875–1946), attorney and President of Cuba
 Ruth Laredo (1937–2005), American pianist
 Jaime Laredo (born 1941), Bolivian violinist and conductor
 Victor Laredo (1910–2003), American documentary filmmaker